The Stafford Plantation was a plantation on Cumberland Island in Camden County, on the southeastern coast of Georgia. It was established  in the early 19th century by Robert Stafford.

19th century
Stafford acquired portions of lands belonging to General Nathanael Greene through auction, and continued to assemble former Greene family lands so that by 1830 Stafford controlled  with 148 slaves. In 1843 Stafford acquired  from P.M. Nightingale, a Greene descendant who retained Dungeness. The primary crop was Sea Island cotton.

Robert Stafford died in 1877. His heirs sold the property to Thomas M. Carnegie and his wife Lucy, who had also acquired Dungeness. All that remains of Stafford's house is a ruin known as "the Chimneys," a series of 24 hearth-and-chimney structures representing Stafford's slaves' housing, about one kilometer east of the main house.

20th century
The Stafford Mansion was built by Lucy Carnegie in 1901, for one of her children. It was one of a series of Carnegie houses on the island, including Plum Orchard, Greyfield, and the main Carnegie residence at Dungeness.

Present day
The property is privately held under a life estate by a Carnegie descendant within Cumberland Island National Seashore.

See also
National Register of Historic Places listings in Camden County, Georgia

References

External links

Slave cabins and quarters in the United States
Cumberland Island
Houses in Camden County, Georgia
Houses completed in 1901
Historic districts on the National Register of Historic Places in Georgia (U.S. state)
Houses on the National Register of Historic Places in Georgia (U.S. state)
Historic American Buildings Survey in Georgia (U.S. state)
National Register of Historic Places in Cumberland Island National Seashore
Cotton plantations in Georgia (U.S. state)
Carnegie family residences